Mike Falkow (born 25 August 1977), is a South African actor, writer, director and producer as well as a Former professional surfer. He is best known for the roles in the films Invictus, Deceived and Smokin' Aces.

Personal life
Falkow was born on 25 August 1977 in Durban, South Africa. He has one brother, Cokey Falkow, an actor and stand-up comedian.

Career
He has a degree in Design and Publishing and worked as a designer and creative director for media companies, agencies and corporations. Before entering acting, he worked as a professional surfer around the world for decades. Then he settled in Los Angeles and worked as the Art Director for Rogue Magazine in Los Angeles.

In 2001, he made television debut with the serial That '70s Show. In the same year, he made the film debut with Dawn of Our Nation and played the role as a "British soldier". Then he appeared in many films and played supportive roles including; Smokin' Aces, Crazy and The House Bunny. Since 2009, he got the opportunity to appear in many international television serials and films such as Invictus, Law & Order: LA, Free Willy: Escape From Pirate's Cove, Scorpion, Deceived and NCIS.

Filmography

References

External links
 

Living people
South African male film actors
1977 births